Information Broadcast Unlimited, Inc. (IBU), is a privately owned Philippine radio and television network based in Angeles City in Pampanga. IBU also known as DZCL-TV was assigned to Ultra High Frequency (UHF) Channel 38 in Pampanga and provisional authority in other provinces in the Philippines.

The IBU corporate address is 2510 Raffles Building, Emerald Avenue, Ortigas Center, Pasig. Due to limited broadcast spectrum resources, IBU has no UHF assignment in Metro Manila. It operates 105.5 FM in Angeles City, Pampanga. It has a wide coverage in Central Luzon with its signal reaching Metro Manila households.

Congressional franchise
On April 28, 2009, House Bill No. 3058 was approved by the House of Representatives. It was approved by the Senate of the Philippines on third reading last May 11, 2009 for approval of the Philippine president, then Gloria Macapagal Arroyo. On July 12, 2009, it was enacted and lapsed into law as Republic Act 9652 without Arroyo's actual signature.

Republic Act 9652 grants IBU a franchise to construct, install, establish, operate and maintain for commercial purposes and in the public
interest, radio and/ or television broadcasting stations in the Philippines, where frequencies and/or channels are still available for radio and/or television broadcasting, including digital radio and television system, through microwave, satellite or whatever means, including the use of any new technology that may hereafter or in the future developed in the field of radio and television broadcasting, with the corresponding technological auxiliaries and facilities, special broadcast and other program and distribution services and relay stations for 25 years.

Private owners
In September 2007, six private individual investors led by businessman Leonardo S. Dayao formed Information Broadcast Unlimited, Inc. with authorized capital stock of 10 million pesos. IBU facilities are located at ComClark Annex Building, M.A. Roxas Highway cor. Ninoy Aquino Ave., Clark Freeport Zone, Pampanga, Philippines together with Angeles Cable Television Network (ACCTN) and various cable networks in Central Luzon.

IBU Stations
All stations are affiliated under UNTV (Philippines), listed as of June 2016:

TV Stations

Inactive Stations

Radio Stations

References

Television networks in the Philippines
Television stations in Metro Manila
Television channels and stations established in 2001
Digital television stations in the Philippines